In 2009 Lancia launched the Lancia di Lancia speedboat at the Venice Film Festival.  Built by the Italian boat builder SACS Marine and designed by Christian Grande DesignWorks. 

The boat has a 6.7-liter common rail turbo diesel engine developed by Fiat Powertrain, producing a total of 1120 hp and producing a top speed of 48 knots.

References

External links
Lancia di Lancia brochure
Lancia Superboat - video

Motorboats
Lancia